Konstantinos Tasoulas (born 17 July 1959, Ioannina, Greece) is a Greek politician and lawyer, serving as Speaker of the Hellenic Parliament from 18 July 2019. A member of the New Democracy, he is a Member of the Hellenic Parliament for Ioannina from 2000.  

He has also served as Minister of Culture and Sports, as Deputy Minister of National Defence and as Mayor of Kifissia.

Biography 
Tasoulas was born in Ioannina, Greece on July 17, 1959. He studied at the Athens Law School of National and Kapodistrian University of Athens and earned a law degree in 1981. 

He also worked as a lawyer in Athens and London, while in 1981-1990 he was special secretary of Evangelos Averoff, before being elected alderman of Kifissia. 

He holds the record of the Speaker of the Parliament with the most votes; having been elected with a record 283 votes "for"(ND, Syriza, KINAL, EL, MeRA25), 15 votes "present" (KKE) and two abstentions (Dimitris Tzanakopoulos and Effie Achtsioglou). It was also the first time a Speaker of the Parliament was elected by open ballot.

References 

|-

}
|-

1959 births
Living people
Politicians from Ioannina
Culture ministers of Greece
New Democracy (Greece) politicians
Mayors of places in Greece
Greek MPs 2019–2023
Speakers of the Hellenic Parliament